Rush is an American medical drama series created by Jonathan Levine and written by Levine, Gina Matthews and Grant Scharbo. It premiered on USA Network on July 17, 2014. On October 2, 2014, USA Network cancelled Rush.

Plot
The series is the story of a hard-partying Los Angeles doctor serving a very specific clientele, the kind with a lot of cash and a lot of secrets.  After Dr. William Rush was dismissed from a major L.A. hospital, he entered "concierge" medicine, making personal visits to the homes and workplaces of wealthy clients and Hollywood celebrities who need his care, often with no questions asked.  Rush demands payment in cash, often thousands of dollars, and in advance.  But some of that money is used to feed his drug habit, and one of the characters in the show, Manny Maquis, is his drug supplier.  Dr. Alex Burke is his best friend who, unlike Rush, is still practicing at a major hospital and trying to be a faithful husband and dad. Eve Parker is Rush's personal assistant who not only sets Rush's medical appointments with patients, but also tries to keep him on track, despite her knowledge of his drug and alcohol use.

Cast

Main
 Tom Ellis as Dr. William P. Rush
 Larenz Tate as Dr. Alex Burke
 Sarah Habel as Eve Parker
 Rick Gonzalez as Manny Maquis

Recurring
 Odette Annable as Sarah Peterson
 Erica Cerra as Laurel Burke
 Rachel Nichols as Corrine Rush
 Harry Hamlin as Dr. Warren Rush
 Warren Christie as J.P.

Production
This series came from Fox 21 and was written and directed by Jonathan Levine, with Gina Matthews and Gretta Scharbo. Adam Fierro was executive producer. Rush was filmed in Vancouver British Columbia, Canada.

Critical reception
Rush scored 44 out of 100 on Metacritic based on 14 "mixed or average" reviews. The review aggregator website Rotten Tomatoes currently reports a 39%  critics rating with an average rating of 4.1/10 based on 18 reviews. The website consensus reads: "A competent but bland medical drama, Rush fails to add anything new to an overly familiar concept".

Episodes

References

External links
 
 

2010s American drama television series
2014 American television series debuts
2014 American television series endings
American action television series
2010s American medical television series
English-language television shows
Television series by 20th Century Fox Television
Television shows set in Los Angeles
USA Network original programming
Television shows filmed in Vancouver